Trinity Baptist Church is a Baptist Christian church in Vacaville, California. It is notable for its annual Christmastime Live Nativity event featuring singers, actors, and live animals. In 2016, Trinity Baptist Church expanded its facilities with a new foyer.

Everett Nourse, who was inducted into the American Theater Organ Society Hall of Fame in 1998, was the longtime organist at Trinity Baptist Church.

Trinity Baptist Church's current Senior Pastor is Greg Davidson, but the church was pastored for 43 years by Milton Steck who retired in 2014.

References

Vacaville, California
Baptist churches in California
Churches in Solano County, California
Year of establishment missing